Gilbert's Coombe is a hamlet north of Redruth in west Cornwall, England. It falls within the Redruth North division on Cornwall Council.

References

Hamlets in Cornwall
Redruth